The Cirneco dell'Etna is an Italian breed of hunting dog from the Mediterranean island of Sicily. It is named for the Etna volcano in eastern Sicily. It has a keen sense of smell, and is used to hunt small game, particularly rabbits. As with many working dogs, registration is conditional on successful completion of a working trial.

History 

The second part of the name of the breed relates to the area of the Etna volcano in Sicily, where it originated. Genetic studies of the relationship of the Cirneco to other breeds have yielded conflicting results: one confirmed it to be close to the Kelb tal-Fenek of Malta and the Podenco Ibicenco of the Balearic Islands, but also linked it to the Pyrenean Mountain Dog; another found evidence of gene flow from the Podenco Canario of the Canary Islands; a genomic study in 2021 found it to be most closely related to the Kelb tal-Fenek and the Segugio Italiano.
It is often controversially claimed that the Cirneco dell'Etna is an ancient breed. The earliest written description of the modern breed was by Maurizio Migneco, a veterinary surgeon from Adrano on the slopes of Etna, who published an account in Il Cacciatore Italiano in 1932. This was seen by a Sicilian noblewoman, Agata Paternó Castello, who bought some of the dogs and in 1934 started breeding them. The breed was recognised by the Ente Nazionale della Cinofilia Italiana in 1939, based on a breed standard drawn up by Giuseppe Solaro of Turin. The Cirneco was definitively accepted by the Fédération Cynologique Internationale in 1956. It is a rare breed; in the period from 2010 to 2018, new registrations in Italy were between about 100 and 150 per year. Breed registration is conditional on successful completion of a working trial in this case a specific field trial  .

Further reading

Notes

References 

FCI breeds
Hounds
Dog breeds originating in Italy
Rare dog breeds